Diocese of Maiduguri may refer to:

Anglican Diocese of Maiduguri
Roman Catholic Diocese of Maiduguri